The 1960–61 FA Cup was the 80th season of the world's oldest football cup competition, the Football Association Challenge Cup, commonly known as the FA Cup. Tottenham Hotspur won the competition for the third time, beating Leicester City 2–0 in the final at Wembley. In doing so, they became the first team to win the Double since Aston Villa in 1897.

Matches were scheduled to be played at the stadium of the team named first on the date specified for each round, which was always a Saturday. Some matches, however, might be rescheduled for other days if there were clashes with games for other competitions or the weather was inclement. If scores were level after 90 minutes had been played, a replay would take place at the stadium of the second-named team later the same week. If the replayed match was drawn further replays would be held until a winner was determined. If scores were level after 90 minutes had been played in a replay, a 30-minute period of extra time would be played.

Calendar

Results

First round proper

At this stage clubs from the Football League Third and Fourth Divisions joined those 30 non-league clubs having come through the qualifying rounds. To complete this round, Gateshead and Hendon given directly byes. Matches were scheduled to be played on Saturday, 5 November 1960. Eleven were drawn and went to replays.

Second round proper 
The matches were scheduled for Saturday, 26 November 1960, with three matches taking place later. Seven matches were drawn, with replays taking place later the same week. However, the Darlington–Hull City match went to another three replays after this before the match finished in Hull City's favour.

Third round proper
The 44 First and Second Division clubs entered the competition at this stage. The matches were scheduled for Saturday, 7 January 1961. Nine matches were drawn and went to replays, with two of these requiring a second replay.

Fourth round proper
The matches were scheduled for Saturday, 28 January 1961, with three games postponed until 1 February. Six matches were drawn and went to replays, which were all played in the following midweek match, and one of these was then replayed a second time.  Tottenham Hotspur and Crewe Alexandra were drawn together for the second consecutive season in the fourth round, with Tottenham having beaten Crewe 13–2 in a replay the one year earlier.

Fifth Round Proper
The matches were scheduled for Saturday, 18 February 1961. One match went to a replay in the following mid-week fixture.

Sixth Round Proper

The four Sixth Round ties were scheduled to be played on Saturday, 4 March 1961. Three of the four matches went to replays in the midweek fixtures before being settled.

Semi-finals

The semi-final matches were played on Saturday, 18 March 1961 with the Leicester City–Sheffield United game requiring two replays. This series of games marked the first time since 1928 that a semi-final had required a second replay, and the first time ever in the FA Cup that a semi-final had failed to produce a goal after a replay. United had the ball in the net through Derek Pace in the first game and although the player insisted that it hit his shoulder, the referee disallowed for handball. Leicester eventually won the tie and so went on to meet Tottenham in the final at Wembley.

Replay

Second Replay

Final

The 1961 FA Cup Final took place on 6 May 1961 at Wembley Stadium and was won by Tottenham Hotspur who defeated Leicester City, by a 2–0 scoreline. In doing so, Tottenham became the first team to complete the League and FA Cup Double since Aston Villa in 1897.

References
General
The FA Cup Archive at TheFA.com
English FA Cup 1961/60 at Soccerbase
F.A. Cup results 1960/61  at footballsite

Specific

 
FA Cup seasons
Fa Cup, 1960-61
1960–61 domestic association football cups